Zach Guthrie (born 30 June 1998) is a professional Australian rules footballer playing for the Geelong Football Club in the Australian Football League (AFL). He was drafted by Geelong with their second selection and thirty-third overall in the 2017 rookie draft. He made his debut in the draw against  at Spotless Stadium in round fifteen of the 2017 season and is the younger brother of Cats midfielder Cameron Guthrie.

Guthrie currently studies a Bachelor of Exercise Sport Science at Deakin University.

Statistics
Updated to the end of the 2022 season.

|-
| 2017 ||  || 39
| 9 || 0 || 1 || 39 || 57 || 96 || 28 || 19 || 0.0 || 0.1 || 4.3 || 6.3 || 10.7 || 3.1 || 2.1
|-
| 2018 ||  || 39
| 7 || 0 || 0 || 50 || 32 || 82 || 25 || 11 || 0.0 || 0.0 || 7.1 || 4.6 || 11.7 || 3.6 || 1.6
|-
| 2019 ||  || 39
| 1 || 0 || 0 || 11 || 2 || 13 || 5 || 1 || 0.0 || 0.0 || 11.0 || 2.0 || 13.0 || 5.0 || 1.0
|-
| 2020 ||  || 39
| 3 || 2 || 0 || 22 || 10 || 32 || 7 || 2 || 0.7 || 0.0 || 7.3 || 3.3 || 10.7 || 2.3 || 0.7
|-
| 2021 ||  || 39
| 13 || 0 || 1 || 120 || 40 || 160 || 51 || 32 || 0.0 || 0.1 || 9.2 || 3.1 || 12.3 || 3.9 || 2.5
|-
| scope=row bgcolor=F0E68C | 2022# ||  || 39
| 21 || 5 || 3 || 224 || 97 || 321 || 116 || 48 || 0.2 || 0.1 || 10.7 || 4.6 || 15.3 || 5.5 || 2.3
|- class=sortbottom
! colspan=3 | Career
! 54 !! 7 !! 5 !! 466 !! 238 !! 704 !! 232 !! 113 !! 0.1 !! 0.1 !! 8.6 !! 4.4 !! 13.0 !! 4.3 !! 2.1
|}

Notes

Honours and achievements
Team
 AFL premiership player: 2022
 2× McClelland Trophy: 2019, 2022

References

External links

1998 births
Living people
Geelong Football Club players
Geelong Football Club Premiership players
Calder Cannons players
Australian rules footballers from Victoria (Australia)
One-time VFL/AFL Premiership players
People from Sunbury, Victoria